The 2013 SWAC men's basketball tournament took place March 12–16, 2013  at the Curtis Culwell Center in Garland, Texas. The tournament champion, Southern University, received the Southwestern Athletic Conference's automatic bid to the 2013 NCAA Men's Division I Basketball Championship.

Format
Seven teams participated in the 2013 tournament. Arkansas-Pine Bluff and Mississippi Valley State each received one-year postseason bans in men's basketball, and thus were not allowed to participate in the 2013 SWAC Tournament, due to failing to meet the NCAA's APR requirements. Texas Southern was serving a two-year postseason ban, after the NCAA Division I Infractions Committee said it found a lack of institutional control and outlined problems spanning 13 sports over a seven-year period.

Bracket

All times listed are Central

References

SWAC men's basketball tournament
2012–13 Southwestern Athletic Conference men's basketball season